Leucaena salvadorensis is a species of flowering plant in the family Fabaceae. It is found in El Salvador, Honduras, and Nicaragua.

References

salvadorensis
Flora of El Salvador
Flora of Honduras
Flora of Nicaragua
Conservation dependent plants
Taxonomy articles created by Polbot